Elkhorn is a city in Walworth County, Wisconsin, United States. As of the 2020 census, it was home to 10,247 people, up from 10,084 at the 2010 census. It is the county seat.

Geography

Elkhorn is located at  (42.672900, −88.540342).

History
In 1836, Colonel Samuel Phoenix spotted a rack of elk antlers in a tree and proclaimed the area as "Elk Horn."

The area's beauty and fertile soil led Daniel Bradley, his brother Milo, and LeGrand Rockwell to create a community in the area. Its growth to a population of 539 led to the first town meeting in 1846. Elkhorn was designated county seat that same year because of its location in Walworth County.

In 1851, Elkhorn became the location of the Walworth County Fair, which is now hosted annually at the Walworth County Fairgrounds. The Walworth County Fair is the largest in Wisconsin after the Wisconsin State Fair.

In the 1870s, saline water from springs located in Elkhorn was believed to cure rheumatism.

Because the city places Christmas decorations around its center, Elkhorn has been called the "Christmas Card Town" since before World War II. This tradition is celebrated every year by an annual oil painting by local artist Jan Castle Reed. These watercolor paintings are turned into Christmas cards.

Elkhorn is also known for the folklore of the Beast of Bray Road, a supposed werewolf type creature that has become the focus of books, movies, documentaries and other elements of pop culture.

Demographics

2010 census
As of the census of 2010, there were 10,084 people, 3,801 households, and 2,514 families living in the city. The racial makeup of the city was 91.4% White, 1.2% African American, 0.2% Native American, 0.7% Asian, 4.8% from other races, and 1.6% from two or more races. Hispanic or Latino of any race were 11.0% of the population.

There were 3,801 households, of which 38.8% had children under the age of 18 living with them, 48.7% were married couples living together, 12.5% had a female householder with no husband present, 4.9% had a male householder with no wife present, and 33.9% were non-families. 27.8% of all households were made up of individuals, and 11% had someone living alone who was 65 years of age or older. The average household size was 2.53 and the average family size was 3.11.

The median age in the city was 34.3 years. 27.5% of residents were under the age of 18; 8.2% were between the ages of 18 and 24; 29.1% were from 25 to 44; 23.3% were from 45 to 64; and 11.9% were 65 years of age or older. The gender makeup of the city was 49.7% male and 50.3% female.

2000 census
As of the census of 2000, there were 7,305 people, 2,919 households, and 1,903 families living in the city. The population density was 1,005.2 people per square mile (388.0/km2). There were 3,014 housing units at an average density of 414.7 per square mile (160.1/km2). The racial makeup of the city was 94.81% White, 0.47% African American, 0.40% Native American, 0.55% Asian, 0.03% Pacific Islander, 2.83% from other races, and 0.92% from two or more races. Hispanic or Latino of any race were 6.13% of the population.

There were 2,919 households, out of which 37.2% had children under the age of 18 living with them, 48.6% were married couples living together, 12.1% had a female householder with no husband present, and 34.8% were non-families. 28.5% of all households were made up of individuals, and 11.2% had someone living alone who was 65 years of age or older. The average household size was 2.48 and the average family size was 3.07.

In the city, the population was spread out, with 28.0% under the age of 18, 8.7% from 18 to 24, 32.2% from 25 to 44, 18.3% from 45 to 64, and 12.8% who were 65 years of age or older. The median age was 34 years. For every 100 females, there were 91.4 males. For every 100 females age 18 and over, there were 87.5 males.

The median income for a household in the city was $38,395, and the median income for a family was $47,475. Males had a median income of $34,867 versus $22,253 for females. The per capita income for the city was $20,003. About 7.4% of families and 9.9% of the population were below the poverty line, including 12.7% of those under age 18 and 10.1% of those age 65 or over.

Transportation 
Elkhorn was a stop on the Racine & Southwestern branch line of the Chicago, Milwaukee, St. Paul and Pacific Railroad, better known as the Milwaukee Road. In its 1980 bankruptcy, the Milwaukee Road disposed of the Southwestern Line. The Wisconsin & Southern continues to service Elkhorn from a connection at Bardwell to the west.

Notable people

 Lucius Allen, Wisconsin State Assembly
 Thomas Ryum Amlie, U.S. Representative
 Charles Coleman, Wisconsin State Assembly
 Christopher DeLange, motorcycle racer
 Ely B. Dewing, Wisconsin State Assembly
 Charles Dunlap, Wisconsin State Assembly
 Sidney Clayton Goff, Wisconsin State Assembly
 John Harris, Wisconsin State Senator
 William H. Hurlbut, Wisconsin State Assembly
 Greg Kent, NFL Player
 Jay G. Lamberson, Wisconsin State Assembly
 Hollis Latham, Wisconsin State Assembly
 Tallan Noble Latz, musician
 John Raleigh, MLB player
 Eldo T. Ridgway, Wisconsin State Senator, mayor of Elkhorn
 Jim Roslof, fantasy artist
 James D. Swan, Wisconsin State Senator
 Patrick Smage, motorcycle racer
 Phil Smage, motorcycle racer
 Joseph Philbrick Webster, composer of In the Sweet By-and-By
 Scott Wedige, NFL player
 Clarence J. Wilger, Wisconsin State Assembly

Images

References

External links

 City of Elkhorn, Wisconsin website
 Elkhorn Chamber of Commerce website
 Sanborn fire insurance maps: 1893 1898 1904 1911

 
Cities in Wisconsin
Cities in Walworth County, Wisconsin
County seats in Wisconsin